The Socialist Party of France (Parti socialiste de France) was a socialist political party.

The party was founded in 1902 during a congress in Commentry by the merger of the Marxist French Workers' Party led by Jules Guesde and the Blanquist Socialist Revolutionary Party of Édouard Vaillant.

Unlike the French Socialist Party of Jean Jaurès, it refused to support bourgeois governments and so to take part in the Bloc des gauches coalition.

However, the two parties merged in 1905 under the pressure of the Second International into the French Section of the Workers' International.

Footnotes

Further reading 
 D. A. MacGibbon (January 1911). "French Socialism Today". Journal of Political Economy.  Part 1. Vol. 19. No. 1. pp. 36−46.
 D. A. MacGibbon (February 1911). "French Socialism Today". Journal of Political Economy. Part 2. Vol. 19. No. 2. pp. 98−110.

External links 
 "Compte rendu du 1er Congrès national, tenu à Commentry les 26, 27 et 28 septembre 1902". Gallica.

Defunct political parties in France
Political parties of the French Third Republic
Socialist parties in France
Second International
Political parties established in 1902
1902 establishments in France
Political parties disestablished in 1905
1905 disestablishments in France